The AHL on CBC was a television broadcast of American Hockey League games in Canada produced by CBC Sports and shown on CBC Television and CBC.ca, during 2010–11.

2010–11 season
During the 2010–11 AHL season, ten broadcasts of the AHL on CBC were produced as part of a one-year contract signed by the CBC and the AHL on Thursday, August 19, 2010. All games were aired at 1:00ET Sunday afternoon across Canada except the January 16 broadcast which aired at 2:00ET. All 10 games involved at least one AHL team that is affiliated with an NHL team based in Canada and all games took place in a Canadian city. The broadcasters for the AHL on CBC were Elliotte Friedman or Nabil Karim as the host, Bruce Rainnie or Dan Robertson as the play-by play announcer, and Brad May as the colour commentator.

2011–12 season
Negotiations were underway for a second season of the AHL on CBC, but the negotiations fell through. The league instead aired on Rogers Sportsnet that season. Eventually, in 2014, CBC announced it would no longer bid for the AHL or any professional sports broadcasting rights.

References

CBC Sports
American Hockey League
2010s Canadian sports television series